Rukometni klub Lovćen is a Montenegrin handball club from Old Royal Capital Cetinje, that plays in Montenegrin First League.

For decades, Lovćen has been the most successful Montenegrin men's handball club and the only team from Montenegro which won men's handball trophies in the Yugoslav era. During the 2001 and 2002, Lovćen played in the EHF Champions League.

History

Formed at 1949, Lovćen is among oldest handball clubs in Montenegro. During the decades, especially from 80's until today, Lovćen became most successful Montenegrin men's handball club, but the most trophied team from Old Royal Capital Cetinje. There is huge number of great Montenegrin, Yugoslav and European players which produced handball school of Lovćen. During the decades, Lovćen became most important base of Montenegro men's national handball team players.

First biggest success, Lovćen made during the start of 80's, when they became permanent member of Yugoslav Second League. In the second half of the same decade, Lovćen won the trophy of Second League champion and became first Montenegrin men's handball club which gained promotion to the First League of SFR Yugoslavia.

First seasons in the First league

First match in First league of SFR Yugoslavia, Lovćen played in October 1988 against RK Jugović away and won with result 23:20. Their first season in strongest domestic competition, Lovćen finished in sixth place. After three successful years in the SFR Yugoslavia, and the matches against great names of European handball like Zagreb Hromos, Metaloplastika Šabac or RK Borac Banja Luka, Lovćen was relegated at the end of season 1990/94.

At the season 1994/95, Lovćen returned to the First League of FR Yugoslavia and in the next years made notable results. With the second place at the end of season 1996/96, Lovćen get promotion to their first European competition - EHF Cup 1997/98. In the next two seasons, team was placed on the top positions of Yugoslav First League, with placements at the Quarterfinals of the EHF Cities Cup and EHF Cup.

Trophies in the FR Yugoslavia

One of the glory days in the club history was 17 May 2000. On that day, Lovćen won their first champions title in the First League. With the four points more than Sintelon Bačka Palanka, Lovćen provided their first appearance in the EHF Champions League.

Season 2000/01 was the most successful in the club history. At the EHF Champions League 2000/01 Lovćen finished as first team in the Group 'D' and played in the Quarterfinals. On that season, fans at Cetinje watched Lovćen games against great European clubs like THW Kiel or Portland San Antonio. At the same period, Lovćen won another one title in the First Yugoslav League, with two points more than Partizan Belgrade. On 8 November 2000, Lovćen recorded their biggest win in the Yugoslav League - against Vojvodina Novi Sad at Cetinje - 43:17.

EHF Champions League 2000/01 - Group D

At the 2001/02 season, Lovćen again participated in the EHF Champions League, but finished domestic season at the second place, after three dramatic play-off finals against Partizan Belgrade (24:23, 24:25, 24:25). During that season, Lovćen won their first trophy on the Yugoslav Cup - in the final match, in Vršac, club from Cetinje defeated Sintelon Bačka Palanka - 19:18.

Next year, Lovćen repeated their success in the Cup of Yugoslavia and that was the last club's trophy during the FR Yugoslavia era. In the next seasons, Lovćen stayed in the top of domestic league, with permanent appearances in the European cups.

Montenegrin independence

Following the Montenegrin independence, national handball association of Montenegro established their own First League and Cup Competition. Lovćen became the first champion of independent Montenegro in the season 2006/07, after 20 matches - 18 wins, 1 draw, 1 loss.

In the next years, Lovćen became weaker in the domestic championship. During the period from 2007 to 2011, Lovćen didn't won any First League title, but they triumphed in the Cup seasons 2009, 2010 and 2011. Finally, at the end of season 2011/12, Lovćen again became Champion of Montenegro, with new Cup title. Same success club made in the season 2012/13, with the best performance in Montenegrin men's handball - 21 match / 21 win (League and Cup). New doubles (league and cup winner) Lovćen made at seasons 2013/14 and 2014/15.

Honours and achievements
National Championships - 11
Champion of FR Yugoslavia (2) 
2000, 2001.
Champion of Montenegro (9) 
2007, 2012, 2013, 2014, 2015, 2018, 2019, 2020, 2021

National Cups - 14
Winner of the FR Yugoslavia Cup (2)
2002, 2003.
Winner of the Montenegrin Cup (12)
 2009, 2010, 2011, 2012, 2013, 2014, 2015, 2017, 2018, 2020, 2021, 2022

European Cups
EHF Champions League
5th place - 2001.

RK Lovćen in domestic and regional competitions

First League seasons

From the 1988 until today, Lovćen played 23 seasons in the First Handball League of SFR Yugoslavia, FR Yugoslavia and Montenegro. Five times, club from Cetinje won the champions' title - in the seasons 1999/00, 2000/01, 2006/07, 2011/12 and 2012/13.

{| class="wikitable sortable" style="text-align:center;"
|-
! Country !! Season !! Placement !!width="30"| M !!width="20"| W !!width="20"| D !!width="20"| L 
|-
| || 1988/89 || 6th || 30 || 16 || 1 || 13
|-
| || 1989/90 || 11th || 30 || 13 || 1 || 16
|-
| || 1990/91 || 15th || 30 || 8 || 0 || 22
|-
| || 1994/95 || 7th || 28 || 12 || 3 || 13
|-
| || 1995/96 || 12th || 29 || 12 || 0 || 17
|-
| || 1996/97 || 2nd || 26 || 16 || 3 || 7
|-
| || 1997/98 || 3rd * || 26 || 16 || 5 || 6
|-
| || 1998/99 || 2nd || 21 || 16 || 1 || 4
|- style="background:gold;"
| || 1999/00 || 1st || 30 || 27 || 1 || 2
|- style="background:gold;"
| || 2000/01 || 1st * || 20 || 17 || 2 || 1
|- 
| || 2001/02 || 1st * || 30 || 26 || 1 || 3
|-
| || 2002/03 || 2nd || 32 || 25 || 2 || 5
|-
| || 2003/04 || 5th || 18 || 9 || 1 || 8
|-
| || 2004/05 || 7th || 18 || 7 || 2 || 9
|-
| || 2005/06 || 3rd || 10 || 5 || 2 || 3
|- style="background:gold;"
| || 2006/07 || 1st || 20 || 18 || 1 || 1
|-
| || 2007/08 || 2nd || 18 || 12 || 0 || 6
|-
| || 2008/09 || 2nd || 28 || 23 || 0 || 5
|-
| || 2009/10 || 3rd || 20 || 12 || 3 || 5
|-
| || 2010/11 || 2nd || 18 || 13 || 2 || 3
|- style="background:gold;"
| || 2011/12 || 1st || 20 || 18 || 1 || 1
|- style="background:gold;"
| || 2012/13 || 1st || 18 || 18 || 0 || 0
|- style="background:gold;"
| || 2013/14 || 1st || 18 || 17 || 0 || 1
|- style="background:gold;"
| || 2014/15 || 1st || 18 || 17 || 0 || 1
|- 
| || 2015/16 || 2nd || 18 || 13 || 1 || 4
|- class="sortbottom"
| || || OVERALL || 574 || 386 || 33 || 155
|}

* Play-off 1997/98 - semifinals: Lovćen - Crvena zvezda 28:29, 23:22, 24:29
* Play-off 2000/01 - final: Lovćen - Sintelon 33:23, 23:22
* Play-off 2001/02 - final: Lovćen - Partizan 24:23, 24:25, 24:25

National Cup trophies

Most trophies in the club history, Lovćen won in the national Cup. Club from Cetinje holds 2 winner titles in the Cup of FR Yugoslavia and five in the Montenegrin Cup.

Lovćen hold Cup trophies from the seasons 2001/02, 2002/03, 2008/09, 2009/10, 2010/11, 2011/12, 2012/13.

Below is the list of final matches in which Lovćen won the Cup trophy.

SEHA League seasons

Lovćen has been a member of Regional SEHA League since its establishment. During the past seasons, Montenegrin club made several great results, like two wins against Zagreb (30:28, 27:25), Vardar (23:21) and Tatran Prešov (30:29). Today, Lovćen is the only SEHA League member from Montenegro.

In their first SEHA League season, Lovćen made surprising result, with final placement on 6th position. Year after that, Lovćen finished season on the same table position.

In the season 2013/14, because of new SEHA League criteria, SRC Lovćen hall was reconstructed, with changing capacity from 1,500 to 2,020. During that season, Lovćen made poorest performance in the SEHA League, winning 9th place on the final table.

{| class="wikitable sortable" style="text-align:center;"
|-
! Season !! Placement !!width="20"| M !!width="20"| W !!width="20"| D !!width="20"| L 
|-
| 2011/2012 || 6th || 21 || 12 || 0 || 9
|-
| 2012/2013 || 6th || 18 || 9 || 2 || 7
|-
| 2013/2014 || 9th || 18 || 3 || 2 || 13
|- class="sortbottom"
||| OVERALL || 57 || 24 || 4 || 29
|}

RK Lovćen in Europe

Handball club Lovćen is permanent member of European handball competitions since 1997. The greatest result Lovćen made during the EHF Champions League 2000/01 when they participated in the quarterfinals against THW Kiel.

Until today, Lovćen played 69 games in European Competitions. Montenegrin club won 27 games, with three draws and 39 defeats.

{| class="wikitable sortable"
|-
! Competition !! Matches !!width="20"| W !!width="20"| D !!width="20"| L !!width="20"| GD
|-
| EHF Champions League ||align = "center"| 18 ||align = "center"| 8 ||align = "center"| 1 ||align = "center"| 9 ||align = "center"| 429:451
|-
| EHF Cup Winners' Cup ||align = "center"| 14 ||align = "center"| 6 ||align = "center"| 1 ||align = "center"| 7 ||align = "center"| 336:362
|-
| EHF Cup ||align = "center"| 25 ||align = "center"| 6 ||align = "center"| 1 ||align = "center"| 18 ||align = "center"| 660:731
|-
| EHF Challenge Cup ||align = "center"| 12 ||align = "center"| 7 ||align = "center"| 0 ||align = "center"| 5 ||align = "center"| 333:303
|- class="sortbottom"
|align = "center"|OVERALL ||align = "center"| 69 ||align = "center"| 27 ||align = "center"| 3 ||align = "center"| 39 ||align = "center"| 1758:1847
|}

Seasons in European competitions

Lovćen played 18 seasons in the EHF European competitions:

1997/98 - EHF Cup
1998/99 - EHF Cities Cup
1999/00 - EHF Cup
2000/01 - EHF Champions League
2001/02 - EHF Champions League
2002/03 - EHF Cup Winners' Cup
2003/04 - EHF Cup Winners' Cup
2005/06 - EHF Cup Winners' Cup
2006/07 - EHF Challenge Cup
2007/08 - EHF Cup
2008/09 - EHF Cup
2009/10 - EHF Cup Winners' Cup
2010/11 - EHF Cup
2011/12 - EHF Cup Winners' Cup
2012/13 - EHF Champions League / EHF Cup
2013/14 - EHF Cup
2014/15 - EHF Cup
2015/16 - EHF Cup

Matches

During the history, Lovćen participated in every European clubs' competition - EHF Champions League, EHF Cup, EHF Challenge Cup (former EHF Cities Cup) and EHF Cup Winners' Cup.

Opponents by countries

In the European competitions, Lovćen played against clubs from various 19 countries, including Montenegro.

{|  class="wikitable sortable" 
!width="190"|Country
!Matches
!width="20"|W
!width="20"|D
!width="20"|L
!GD
|-
| Austria
|align = "center"| 2
|align = "center"| 2
|align = "center"| 0
|align = "center"| 0
|align = "center"| 60:39
|-
| Belarus
|align = "center"| 2
|align = "center"| 2
|align = "center"| 0
|align = "center"| 0
|align = "center"| 55:43
|-
| Bosnia and Herzegovina
|align = "center"| 9
|align = "center"| 5
|align = "center"| 0
|align = "center"| 4
|align = "center"| 273:234
|-
| Czech Republic
|align = "center"| 4
|align = "center"| 2
|align = "center"| 1
|align = "center"| 1
|align = "center"| 117:108
|-
| Denmark
|align = "center"| 6
|align = "center"| 1
|align = "center"| 0
|align = "center"| 5
|align = "center"| 138:160
|-
| Faroe Islands
|align = "center"| 2
|align = "center"| 1
|align = "center"| 0
|align = "center"| 1
|align = "center"| 67:54
|-
| France
|align = "center"| 2
|align = "center"| 1
|align = "center"| 0
|align = "center"| 1
|align = "center"| 47:57
|-
| Germany
|align = "center"| 2
|align = "center"| 1
|align = "center"| 0
|align = "center"| 1
|align = "center"| 51:59
|-
| Israel
|align = "center"| 2
|align = "center"| 0
|align = "center"| 0
|align = "center"| 2
|align = "center"| 64:65
|-
| Luxembourg
|align = "center"| 2
|align = "center"| 0
|align = "center"| 1
|align = "center"| 1
|align = "center"| 64:67
|-
| Montenegro
|align = "center"| 2
|align = "center"| 1
|align = "center"| 0
|align = "center"| 1
|align = "center"| 46:42
|-
| Netherlands
|align = "center"| 2
|align = "center"| 0
|align = "center"| 0
|align = "center"| 2
|align = "center"| 41:64
|-
| Norway
|align = "center"| 6
|align = "center"| 4
|align = "center"| 0
|align = "center"| 2
|align = "center"| 162:163
|-
| Portugal
|align = "center"| 11
|align = "center"| 3
|align = "center"| 0
|align = "center"| 8
|align = "center"| 240:273
|-
| Romania
|align = "center"| 2
|align = "center"| 1
|align = "center"| 0
|align = "center"| 1
|align = "center"| 42:45
|-
| Russia
|align = "center"| 2
|align = "center"| 1
|align = "center"| 0
|align = "center"| 1
|align = "center"| 50:58
|-
| Slovenia
|align = "center"| 2
|align = "center"| 0
|align = "center"| 0
|align = "center"| 2
|align = "center"| 44:68
|-
| Spain
|align = "center"| 4
|align = "center"| 1
|align = "center"| 0
|align = "center"| 3
|align = "center"| 90:116
|-
| Switzerland
|align = "center"| 2
|align = "center"| 0
|align = "center"| 0
|align = "center"| 2
|align = "center"| 47:67
|-
| Turkey
|align = "center"| 3
|align = "center"| 1
|align = "center"| 1
|align = "center"| 1
|align = "center"| 70:65
|- class="sortbottom"
|align = "center"|OVERALL
|align = "center"| 69
|align = "center"| 27
|align = "center"| 3
|align = "center"| 39
|align = "center"| 1758:1847
|}

Current squad

RK Lovćen Cetinje roster - season 2013/14
As of 10 March 2014

Goalkeepers
1  Vladan Abramović
16  Vuko Borilović
22  Dušan Cicmil

Right wingers
8  Mirko Radović
20  Draško Kaluđerović

Left wingers
9  Igor Marković (cap)
7  Milan Popović
99  Vuk Lipovina

Line players
18  Ivan Radović
20  Andrija Pejović
41  Stefan Čizmović

Back players
4  Petar Petričević
11  Miodrag Stanojević
17  Marko Drašković
23  Vuk Latković
34  Bogdan Nikolić
43  Lukasz Achruk
44  Miloš Ojdanić
77  Goran Lasica

Coach:  Zoran Abramović
Official kit supplier: Legea
Sponsors: Prijestonica Cetinje / Old Royal Capital Cetinje (city government), Lovćen Osiguranje / Lovćen Insurance

Notable former players

 Veselin Vujović
 Pero Milošević
 Goran Đukanović
 Ratko Đurković
 Petar Kapisoda
  Nenad Puljezević
 Igor Butulija
 Stevo Nikočević
 Goran Stojanović
 Alen Muratović
  Nikola Marinović 
 Predrag Peruničić
 Draško Mrvaljević
 Mladen Rakčević
 Dejan Unčanin
 Marko Dobrković
 Aleksandar Svitlica
 Blažo Lisičić
 Dalibor Čutura
 Igor Marković

 Ivan Ražnatović

 Vuk Milošević
 Petar Vujanović
 Ilija Ivanović
 Stevan Vujović
 Novica Rudović
 Nebojša Stojinović
 Nikola Vujović
 Marko Dapčević
 Milan Vučićević
 Brano Božović
 Radivoje Ristanović
 Goran Biljaka
 Mladen Čačić
 Miodrag Ašanin
 Andrija Pejović
 Ivan Šmigić
 Marko Pejović
 Danijel Vukićević
 Ivan Perišić
 Goran Lasica
 Aleksandar Beljić
 Milan Vučićević
 Bogdan Petričević
 Vasko Ševaljević
 Muhamed Mustafić
 Selman Beširović
 Blažo Popović
 Vladan Lipovina 
 Danilo Mihaljević

Notable coaches
 Veselin Vujović
 Pero Milošević
 Branko Dumnić
 Ljubomir Obradović
 Ranko Popović
 Nikola Adžić

See also 
 RK Lovćen in the First League
 RK Lovćen in SEHA League
 SD Lovćen Cetinje
 Cetinje

External links 
Official website
 Handball Federation of Montenegro
 balkan-handball

Lovćen Cetinje
Lovcen
Handball clubs established in 1949
1949 establishments in Yugoslavia